Tyler Seitz (born 13 August 1976) is a Canadian luger. He competed at the 1998 Winter Olympics and the 2002 Winter Olympics.

References

External links
 

1976 births
Living people
Canadian male lugers
Olympic lugers of Canada
Lugers at the 1998 Winter Olympics
Lugers at the 2002 Winter Olympics
Lugers from Calgary